The Punti–Hakka Clan Wars were a conflict between the Hakka and Cantonese people in Guangdong, China between 1855 and 1867. The wars were fierce around the Pearl River Delta, especially in Toi Shan of the Sze Yup counties. The wars resulted in roughly a million dead with many more fleeing for their lives.

Background
Hakka literally means guest family, and Punti literally means natives. The Punti are also referred to by the languages that they spoke, Yue Chinese. The origins of the bloody conflict lay in resentment of the Cantonese towards the Hakka people, whose dramatic population growth threatened the Cantonese people. The Hakka were marginalized and resentful in turn. They were forced to inhabit the hills and waterways, rather than the fertile plains.

The existing Cantonese-speaking natives (bendi) of those areas, known in Cantonese as "Punti", were protective of their own more fertile lands. The newcomers were pushed to the outer fringes of fertile plains, or they settled in more mountainous regions to eke out a living. Conflict between the two groups grew and it is thought that "Hakka" became a term of derision used by the "Punti" that was aimed at the newcomers. Eventually, the tension between the two groups (the Hakkas had by then been settled for several hundred years and could not be regarded as migrants in any sense) would lead to a series of 19th-century skirmishes in the Pearl River Delta, known as the Punti–Hakka Clan Wars. The problem was not that the two groups spoke a different language. In fact, the "locals" comprised different peoples speaking several mutually-unintelligible tongues, as was typical of the Chinese countryside all over southern China, but they would regard one another as "locals" or Puntis and exclude the Hakkas from such designation. (The Chinese bendi describes any native people in any location; the English term "Punti" describes the native Cantonese in Guangdong but not the emigrant Cantonese elsewhere.)

Over time, the newcomers adopted the term "Hakka" to refer to themselves, not least because of the migratory tendencies inherent in their own culture. Although most of the immigrants who were called Hakkas were Hakka-speakers, the term was later used to include various hill ethnicities such as the She and Yao people, which were registered as so-called "Guest Families" since they had migrated with the Hakkas from the hills. Intermarriages among Hakka and Punti was extremely rare. Studies of both Cantonese and Hakka genealogies, some Hakka and Punti people with the same surnames allege that they may have the same ancestors, but their descendants strongly identify with one group to the exclusion of the other.

During the Qing conquest of the Ming, Ming loyalists under Koxinga 
established a temporary seat and regional office for the Ming dynasty in Taiwan in the hopes of eventually retaking Mainland China. In an attempt to defeat those warriors and pirates without a war, the Kangxi Emperor strengthened his dynasty's sea ban (haijin) in 1661 and issued the order for the Great Clearance of the southeastern coast. The governors and viceroys of the affected provinces submitted scathing memorials, and the policy was reversed after eight years. In 1669 and 1671, however, strong typhoons destroyed what few settlements existed.

As far fewer Punti returned to the abandoned lands than had been expected, the Qing ruler decided to provided incentives to repopulate these areas. The most visible of those who responded were the Hakka. For some time, the Punti and the Hakka lived together peacefully. As the population of Guangdong Province soared, life became increasingly difficult, and unrest broke out, such as the Red Turban Rebellion, which was led by the Cantonese, and attacked Ho Yun and Fat Shan.

Clan war
During the Red Turban Rebellion in Canton, the Hakkas had helped the imperial army raid Punti villages to kill the rebels and any real or suspected sympathisers, including villagers who had been forced to pay taxes to the Red Turbans. That precipitated open hostility between the Hakka and the Punti, with the Punti attacking Hakka villages in revenge.

Battles raged in which both sides fortified their villages with walls, destroyed bridges and roads, and raised armies as best they could. Entire villages were involved in the fighting, with all able-bodied men called to fight. The Cantonese were armed with the help of their relatives in Hong Kong and the Chinese diaspora who lived abroad. Some captives were sold to Cuba and South America as coolies through Hong Kong and Macau, and others were sold to the brothels of Macau. During the war, 500,000 perished from genocidal fighting in which thousands of villages were destroyed, but an even greater number perished in epidemics.

Resolution
The conflict reached a devastating scale. It is estimated that over a million died and that thousands of villages were destroyed. The Punti significantly outnumbered the Hakka, whose losses were therefore more extensive. The population share of Hakka in the Sze Yup area dropped to 3%, with many relocating to Guangxi.

See also
 Zhangzhou-Quanzhou conflict, Lin Shuangwen rebellion 
 Hakka
 Punti
 Cantonese culture

References

External links

 土客械斗十二年 (Simplified Chinese)
 Punti-Hakka Clan Wars
 

Wars involving the Qing dynasty
Clannism
History of Hong Kong
Military history of Guangdong
Cantonese culture
Hakka culture in China
Hakka culture in Hong Kong
19th-century military history of China
19th-century conflicts
Siyi